Ultimate Spider-Man (titled Ultimate Spider-Man: Web Warriors for the third season and Ultimate Spider-Man vs. the Sinister Six for its final season) is an American superhero animated television series broadcast on the cable network Disney XD, based on the Spider-Man comics published by Marvel Comics. The series featured writers such as Brian Michael Bendis (who also created the comic book series of the same name), Paul Dini, and Man of Action (a group consisting of Steven T. Seagle, Joe Kelly, Joe Casey and Duncan Rouleau).

It was first announced in early 2012, and debuted alongside the second season of The Avengers: Earth's Mightiest Heroes as part of the Marvel Universe programming block on April 1, 2012. In a break from other series, Spider-Man breaks the fourth wall and speak directly to the audience. It also includes fantasy sequences from Peter's mind.

The series concluded its run on January 7, 2017, with the two-part episode "Graduation Day." with 4 seasons each consisting of 26 episodes. Reruns continued to air on Disney XD until August 30, 2017.

Synopsis
Peter Parker has been Spider-Man for one year. He has saved lives and fought supervillains, but he is still in the process of learning how to be a superhero. Nick Fury of S.H.I.E.L.D. offers Peter the chance to train to be a real superhero and become "The Ultimate Spider-Man". However, Peter will first have to learn how to work with a team of four fellow teenage superheroes: Nova, White Tiger, Iron Fist, and Power Man.

Season 1
During the first season, corrupt industrialist Norman Osborn targets Spider-Man in the shadows in hopes of collecting his DNA to create a spider-soldier army to sell to the government. To do this, he uses Doctor Octopus as his pawn, having him send numerous supervillains (like Whirlwind, Taskmaster) after Spider-Man and use a sample of Spidey's blood to create the Venom symbiote, which ends up bonding with Harry Osborn, Norman's son and Peter's best friend. In the two-part season finale, Spider-Man learns that it was Norman who was the mastermind behind Doctor Octopus' schemes and Venom's creation, just in time to see Doctor Octopus take his revenge on Norman for the way he treated him by turning him into the Green Goblin.

Season 2
In the second season, following the fight with the Green Goblin which destroyed the S.H.I.E.L.D. Helicarrier, Spider-Man's team ends up staying at Peter Parker's house. In the season premiere, after learning that Spider-Man got his powers from one of Oscorp's genetically altered spiders at the end of last season, Doctor Octopus creates a bunch of serums with animal DNA in hopes of re-creating the process and S.H.I.E.L.D. scientist Dr. Curt Connors, still dealing with the aftermath of the Helicarrier's destruction after injuring his right arm and having it amputated, injects himself with one of these serums to become the Lizard. Later, Doctor Octopus controls Lizard so that he can join him, Electro, Rhino, Kraven the Hunter, and Beetle as a member of the Sinister Six. While Spider-Man and his team can defeat the Sinister Six, Lizard gets away, and Spider-Man swears to find and cure him. Later the Sinister Six reappears in the penultimate episode with Beetle replaced by Scorpion. During the season, Spider-Man learns more about his teammates' origins: Ava Ayala having assumed the mantle of White Tiger after her father Hector was killed by Kraven, Sam Alexander being the last member of the Nova Corps since former member Titus wiped the rest out trying to get another helmet and was recruited by the Guardians of the Galaxy, Danny Rand having assumed the mantle of Iron Fist after training in K'un-L'un and Luke Cage had received his powers from a S.H.I.E.L.D. version of the Super Soldier Formula developed by his parents. Norman Osborn, who was the Green Goblin, was healed and reformed, becoming Iron Patriot to mend his mistakes in the past by helping Spider-Man and his team, but in the escape of the Sinister Six, Spider-Man cures the Lizard with an antidote which turns him back into Dr. Connors while Doctor Octopus turns Norman back into the Green Goblin who turns Spider-Man's team into monster goblins like him, but Spider-Man cures them with an antidote and they prevent Green Goblin from spreading the goblin gas on New York on the old Helicarrier.

Season 3 (Ultimate Spider-Man: Web-Warriors)
In the third season, Spider-Man officially joins the Avengers, but after a fight with Loki, Doctor Octopus and a group of Norse creatures (Ulik the Savage - Rock Trolls, Frost Dragons, Frost Giants, Fenris Wolf)  bonded with the Venom symbiote, he chooses to resign and remain with S.H.I.E.L.D. In the aftermath, the symbiote permanently bonds with Flash Thompson to become Agent Venom and Spider-Man is tasked by Nick Fury to recruit other young heroes to form the New Warriors. At the same time, Green Goblin hires Taskmaster to find the young heroes before Spider-Man does and form the Thunderbolts. Spider-Man manages to recruit Ka-Zar and his pet smilodon Zabu from the Savage Land, and Amadeus Cho in the Iron Spider armor, while Taskmaster recruits Cloak and Dagger and Vulture. When the Thunderbolts attempt to free Green Goblin, Doctor Octopus, Beetle and Scorpion, Spider-Man leads the New Warriors against the group, and is able to convince Cloak and Dagger to switch sides. The New Warriors ultimately defeat the villains, but Green Goblin escapes with the Siege Perilous, leading to a variation of the Spider-Verse storyline in which he travels across the Multiverse to collect DNA samples of Spider-Man's alternate counterparts to turn himself into the Spider-Goblin. Chasing after him, Spider-Man meets up with Spider-Man 2099, Spider-Girl, Spider-Man Noir, Spider-Ham, Spyder-Knight, and Miles Morales, helping them each one by one with their problems, before teaming up with all of them to take down Spider-Goblin and a giant Helicarrier robot controlled by Electro. After both are defeated and the alternate Spider-Men return to their homes, Goblin reverts into Norman Osborn and ends up suffering amnesia, making him forget his time as the Goblin. Afterwards, Spider-Man and his team begin their education at the S.H.I.E.L.D. Academy located at the Triskelion while dealing with the reawakened Arnim Zola. Not long afterwards, Spider-Man gets involved in a contest between the Collector and the Grandmaster for the fate of Earth. During this time, Aunt May, Agent Venom, and Iron Spider learn of Spider-Man's identity.

Season 4 (Ultimate Spider-Man vs. the Sinister 6)
As the fourth and final season begins, Doctor Octopus allies himself with Arnim Zola and HYDRA and begins to form a new 
iteration of the Sinister Six starting with Kraven the Hunter. When Doctor Octopus attempts to turn Norman Osborn back into Green Goblin, he finds that Osborn injected himself with an anti-Goblin serum to prevent further transformations. Doctor Octopus then uses the Siege Perilous to summon the Green Goblin's demonic winged counterpart from Miles Morales's universe and after a brief battle recruits him instead. He bribes Rhino into becoming a spy for him while operating as a student at the S.H.I.E.L.D. Academy in exchange for finding a cure for his condition. When Spider-Man and his team accidentally release the water-made criminal Hydro-Man, Doctor Octopus spares no expense in recruiting him. Doctor Octopus then completes his lineup with Electro. Spider-Man forms his own new team consisting of Agent Venom, Iron Spider, Miles Morales (going by the name Kid Arachnid now), and the newly introduced Scarlet Spider (who has no identity and is later named Ben by Aunt May). It was later revealed that Doctor Octopus actually created the Sinister Seven and that Scarlet Spider was the real spy for him, and unmasks Spider-Man in front of Doctor Octopus, revealing his identity. This leads to Doctor Octopus leading up to his next plot that has him turning against Arnim Zola and captures Aunt May. However, Scarlet Spider has a change of heart at the last minute, he ends up sacrificing himself to save the city from Doctor Octopus.

Soon after, Spider-Man discovers the reason behind Fury and Nova's disappearance; they were protecting Madame Web from HYDRA, but were ultimately discovered and Fury was held hostage by HYDRA and Crossbones. After Fury is rescued by Spider-Man, Madame Web and Triton, Fury and Madame Web go into hiding again to protect themselves from HYDRA, with Fury leaving Spider-Man in complete control of S.H.I.E.L.D. Academy during his absence. Later, Crossbones and Michael Morbius do some experiments with the Venom symbiote which leads to the revival of Carnage leading up to Carnage's explosion causing every civilian to turn into Carnage-like monsters. Harry awakens from his coma and reverts into Anti-Venom, and begins to drain the Carnage symbiotes away from the civilians. After losing control, Peter reveals his identity to Harry, who reverts to himself, before re-emerging with Anti-Venom to destroy the Carnage symbiotes. The Carnage symbiote reveals itself to still be alive, however, and goes on a rampage throughout the city in direction of Midtown High to find Mary Jane Watson, who was overtaken by the Carnage symbiote to become the "Carnage Queen". They are attacked by Morbius, who became a living vampire due to the injection he received from Doctor Octopus. Spider-Man, Agent Venom and Patrioteer ultimately save Mary Jane from the symbiote after revealing their identities to her, and she destroys the symbiote herself. Unbeknownst to Spider-Man, a fragment of the Carnage symbiote is inside her body.

Later on, Madame Web comes to the conclusion that the destruction of the Siege Perilous during the fight with Doctor Octopus and alternate Green Goblin has shattered the dimensional barriers between numerous worlds. Spider-Man and Miles Morales travel to alternate realities in order to collect the pieces of the Siege Perilous, but an evil version of Spider-Man named Wolf Spider seeks to reassemble the pieces in his plans to conquer the Multiverse. During their adventure, they reunite with Spider-Man Noir and meet other spider-based characters as they work to get to the Siege Perilous shards before Wolf Spider does. They find the last piece in Miles' native dimension where they learn that since he and Goblin left, crime got even higher and the universe's native Aunt May, feeling that it needs a Spider, used leftover equipment from the universe's native Peter Parker (who died in a fight with the demonic Green Goblin) to turn one of his friends Gwen Stacy into a new spider-powered hero Spider-Woman. Together with her, they repair the Siege Perilous, but Wolf Spider manages to swipe it and go forth with his plan. Spider-Man manages to deceive his evil counterpart into absorbing too much power, causing him to explode which sends the life force of the other spiders back to their native homes. Although they have the Siege Perilous and after seeing how well Spider-Woman has done with protecting his universe, Miles decides to let her remain as the main spider-powered person of it, while he and his mother Rio Morales permanently settle in Spider-Man's native dimension.

In a similarity to the Clone Saga, Spider-Man and Mary Jane soon discover the clone of Spider-Man called Kaine who tries to feed off them. The clone of Spider-Man eventually leads them to "Project Kaine" which involves combining the DNA of Spider-Man with the Synthezoids. Surprisingly, Mary Jane is able to control the Carnage Symbiote inside her, thanks to Dr Connors experiment and assumes the identity of Spider-Woman. It is discovered that Doctor Octopus and Arnim Zola had created Scarlet Spider as part of Weapon S which are Spider-Man/Synthezoid Spider-Slayers where he is to have been the leader of the Delta-Nine Synthezoids that consist of Bone Spider, Goliath Spider, and Ghost Spider. When Scarlet Spider gets control of the Delta-Nine Synthezoids and Doctor Octopus reclaims his Nanotech that gives him a more mobile body, Spider-Man's group causes HYDRA Island to sink into the water again. They head back to the Triskelion, the other team of Spider-Man: Nova, Power Man, Iron Fist, and Squirrel Girl attack Scarlet Spider and the Delta-Nine Synthezoids, because they know Scarlet Spider worked for Doctor Octopus, who, not only knows Spider-Man's identity, but also endangered S.H.I.E.L.D. Academy and Aunt May, being all against him. Kaine returns and draining the energies of its inhabitants enough to leave them with coma-like symptoms, he targets the spider-based heroes. The Web-Warriors fight Kaine, but he gets control of the Delta-Nine Synthezoids. Spider-Man and the other spider-based heroes try to defeat Kaine even when he combines with the Delta-Nine Synthezoids to form a hybrid form called The Ultimate Spider-Slayer until Agent Venom saves Scarlet Spider and uses the energy transmitter to overload to explode.

In the series' climax, the graduation day comes in which Doctor Octopus warns Peter Parker that he should never become Spider-Man and save his Aunt May from dying. Spider-Man quickly goes to the Triskelion and assembles his team, the New Warriors and Web-Warriors, and tells them about what happened in the morning. Doctor Octopus along with his Superior Sinister Six capture Spider-Man and use an antidote on him to which he loses his spider powers but after working with Norman Osborn at Oscorp who now knows that Peter Parker is Spider-Man, Spider-Man is able to gain his spider powers back and uses the antidote to cure Vulture, Rhino, and a Lizard-mutated Crossbones and defeat Scorpion and Kraven. With the same antidote, Spider-Man also defeats and cures Doctor Octopus of his mindless Octopus monster form, on which Octavius is eventually convinced that Spider-Man shows respect for him despite all difficulties and redeems himself by helping Spider-Man undo the force-field he projected to destroy Spider-Man's teammates and the graduation attendants. In the epilogue, Otto Octavius eventually surrenders as he is taken under custody by Iron Man, Spider-Man and his teammates successfully graduate as Agent Venom and Scarlet Spider are named the new teachers in S.H.I.E.L.D. Academy. After a conversation with his Aunt May (after moving to another home), Peter eventually takes on his old super hero life satisfied to have finally become what he trained in S.H.I.E.L.D. to be: The Ultimate Spider-Man.

Episodes

Participation in other programs 
He also made guest appearances in episodes of other series: In Avengers Assemble, in the episodes "Hulk's Day Out", "Avengers Disassembled" and "Avengers Underground", and in Hulk and the Agents of S.M.A.S.H., in the episodes "The Collector", "The Venom Within", "Spidey, I Blew Up the Dinosaur" and "Planet Monster, Part 2".

Two other alternate versions of it also appeared:

In Avengers Assemble, in the episode "Planet Doom", Slinger, a masked vigilante member of the Defenders, was introduced. Unlike the original Spider-Man, Slinger is sarcastic and cynical, making snide comments and doubting Thor's ability to be their savior. His costume is similar to that of Spider-Man Noir's.

And in Hulk and the Agents of S.M.A.S.H., in the episode "Days of Future Smash, Part 1 - The Dino Era", in a dinosaur-dominated timeline has a dinosaur version of Spider-Man called Spider-Raptor. Alongside El Diablo, he was among those who fought the tyranny of King Sauron. With help from the Agents of S.M.A.S.H., Spider-Raptor and El Diablo were able to free the primitive humans and overthrow King Sauron.

Drake Bell also voiced Spider-Man in Phineas and Ferb: Mission Marvel, which was a crossover episode of Phineas and Ferb.

Cast

 Drake Bell – Peter Parker/Spider-Man, Swarm, Kaine, Spider-Slayer Synthezoids
 Dee Bradley Baker – Dr. Curt Connors/Lizard, Sandman, Carnage, Chitauri Soldier, Venom (Season 3), Wendigo King, Zzzax 
 Ogie Banks – Luke Cage/Power Man, Miles Morales/Kid Arachnid
 Eric Bauza – Amadeus Cho/Iron Spider, Michael Tan, Arcade, Scorpion
 Greg Cipes – Danny Rand/Iron Fist
 Clark Gregg – Phil Coulson 
 Tom Kenny – Doctor Octopus, Wizard, Dr. Curt Connors (Season 1), Vulture, Whirlwind, Aries Soldier, Octobot, Merlin
 Matt Lanter – Harry Osborn/Patrioteer/Anti-Venom, Flash Thompson/Agent Venom, Klaw, Venom (Main Hosts) 
 Misty Lee – Aunt May Parker, Squirrel Girl, Salem's Witch 
 Caitlyn Taylor Love – Ava Ayala/White Tiger
 Chi McBride – Nick Fury, Taurus Soldier, Thunderball 
 Logan Miller – Sam Alexander/Nova, Young Flash Thompson
 Scott Porter – Ben Reilly/Scarlet Spider, Scarlet Spider Synthezoids
 J. K. Simmons<ref name=Simmons>{{cite web|author=Melrose, Kevin|title=J.K. Simmons Confirms JJJ in Ultimate Spider-Man|url=http://spinoff.comicbookresources.com/2011/03/18/j-k-simmons-confirms-hell-voice-jjj-in-ultimate-spider-man/|publisher=Spinoff Online|access-date=March 18, 2011 |archive-date=March 3, 2016|archive-url=https://web.archive.org/web/20160303231252/http://spinoff.comicbookresources.com/2011/03/18/j-k-simmons-confirms-hell-voice-jjj-in-ultimate-spider-man/|url-status=dead}}</ref> – J. Jonah Jameson
 Tara Strong – Mary Jane "MJ" Watson/Spider-Woman/Carnage Queen, Thundra, Sandy 
 Steven Weber – Norman Osborn/Green Goblin/Iron Patriot/Goblin King, Trapster, Venom (Seasons 1 & 2), Ultimate Green Goblin

Production
The series is adapted from the Ultimate Spider-Man comic book, which was created by writer Brian Michael Bendis. Bendis and Paul Dini served as writers and producers on the show. Man of Action (a group consisting of Steven T. Seagle, Joe Kelly, Joe Casey and Duncan Rouleau), the creators of the animated series Ben 10 and Generator Rex, serve as supervising producers on the show. Twenty-six episodes were ordered for the first season. According to Paul Dini, the series features a "redefined" Peter Parker, and a combination of frequent guest stars loosely based on Bendis' comics, and original material, such as the origins of some heroes and villains. Actor J. K. Simmons reprises his role as J. Jonah Jameson from Sam Raimi's live-action Spider-Man film trilogy for the series. Notable voice actors include Adrian Pasdar as Iron Man (returning to the role after previously having voiced him in Madhouse's and Marvel's Iron Man anime),Goldman, Eric (April 20, 2012). "Ultimate Spider-Man: Make Way for Iron Man!". IGN. and Kevin Michael Richardson, who voices Robbie Robertson and Bulldozer.

The series depicts Spider-Man becoming the newest member of S.H.I.E.L.D. under the leadership of Nick Fury, on a team with four other teenage superheroes. Villains such as Living Laser, Venom and Doctor Doom were seen in a trailer shown at the 2011 San Diego Comic Con.Ultimate Spider-Man premiered on April 1, 2012, on Disney XD in the United States, while the pilot episode was released on Xbox Live and PlayStation Store on April 2, 2012. In the UK and Ireland, the show premiered on Disney UK and Ireland on May 31, 2013. It premiered in Canada on June 22, 2012, on Teletoon.

Disney XD and Marvel officially announced Season 3 on July 20, 2013, at San Diego Comic Con. Season 3, retitled Ultimate Spider-Man: Web-Warriors, includes Spider-Man joining the Avengers (consisting of the line-up from Avengers Assemble) and introducing characters such as Cloak and Dagger, Amadeus Cho, Ka-Zar and Agent Venom.

A fourth season, retitled Ultimate Spider-Man vs. the Sinister 6, began broadcasting on February 21, 2016.

Promotions and tie-ins

Launch parties for the series were held in New York City and Los Angeles on March 31, 2012, the day before the series' broadcast television debut. On hand at the New York City party at Midtown Comics Downtown in Manhattan were Marvel Chief Creative Officer Joe Quesada, writer/producer Joe Kelly and Chris Eliopoulos, who wrote the first issue of the tie-in comic book, while the Los Angeles party at Meltdown Comics in Hollywood was attended by Marvel Head of Television Jeph Loeb, Duncan Rouleau, Steven T. Seagle, voice actors Clark Gregg and Misty Lee, and Creative Consultant Paul Dini, who wrote the series pilot.Zalben, Alex (March 29, 2012). "'Ultimate Spider-Man' Premiere Party This Saturday In NYC!". MTV Geek.

A comic book series that ties in with the show called Ultimate Spider-Man Adventures debuted on April 25, 2012. Ultimate Spider-Man Adventures is an ongoing series and is being released alongside The Avengers: Earth's Mightiest Heroes Adventures. The comics was written by Dan Slott and Ty Templeton, while Nuno Plati provided artwork. In 2015, Marvel began releasing a series of free digital comics simply called Ultimate Spider-Man, which can be read on the "Marvel Kids" website.

Additionally, the U.K branch of Panini Comics released eleven issues in their Ultimate Spider-Man Magazine! that tied into the third season, Ultimate Spider-Man: Web-Warriors.

In the 2014 comic book crossover storyline, "Spider-Verse", the version of Spider-Man from the cartoon teams up with the comics version of Spider-Man of Earth-616 in recruiting a Spider-Man Army to fight the Inheritors.

Crew
 Brian Michael Bendis – Writer, Producer, Creative Producer
 Dana Booton – Supervising Producer
 Dan Buckley – Executive Producer
 Joe Casey – Writer, Supervising Producer
 Paul Dini – Writer, Producer, Creative Consultant
 Alan Fine – Executive Producer
 Henry Gilroy – Supervising Producer
 Joe Kelly – Writer, Supervising Producer
 Cort Lane – Co-Executive Producer, Supervising Producer
 Stan Lee – Co-Executive Producer
 Jeph Loeb – Executive Producer
 Leanne Moreau – Line Producer
 Joe Quesada – Executive Producer
 Eric Radomski – Co-Executive Producer
 Duncan Rouleau – Writer, Supervising Producer
 Steven T. Seagle – Writer, Supervising ProducerBeard, Jim (March 13, 2012). "Meet the Men of Action: Steven T. Seagle". Marvel Comics.
 Eugene Son – Story Editor
 Alex Soto – Supervising Director
 Collette Sunderman – Casting and Voice Director
 Harrison Wilcox – Associate Producer

Reception

Critical reception
The series received generally positive reviews from audiences and mixed reviews from critics. Brian Lowry of Variety criticized the series, suggesting that the source material was "strained through the juvenile, rapid-fire-joke filter of Family Guy", and called the show a "high-profile misfire" that didn't "bode well for Marvel's efforts to straddle the line of catering to kids without dumbing down venerable properties that plenty of adults know and love."

IGN gave the show an 6/10.

David Sims of The A.V. Club gave the pilot a "C" ranking, writing that the first episode "feels rather lame and perfunctory, with wackiness dialed up to 11 in an effort to distract from how fundamentally bland it is." Sim subsequently gave a "C+" to the episode "Doomed" and a "B+" to the episode "Back in Black." Oliver Sava, also of The A.V. Club, gave the episode "Venom" a "B", stating that the title of the show should be changed to Synergy Spider-Man, because it goes beyond movie and Ultimate continuity to create an entry point for young viewers into the main line of Marvel titles. Sava subsequently gave the episode "Field Trip" an "A−".

Emily Ashby of Common Sense Media'' gave the show a 4 out of 5 stars, noting the abundance of action and humor afforded by the series' premise, and opining that the lessons that Parker learns about growth and responsibility under the guidance of his mentor and friends would at least make lasting impressions on young viewers.

Awards and nominations

Adaptations
Marvel Universe Ultimate Spider-Man: Adaptation of first 2 seasons.
Marvel Universe Ultimate Spider-Man: Web-Warriors: Adaptation of 3rd season.
Ultimate Spider-Man: Web-Warriors: Spider-Verse: Adaptation of 3rd season.
Marvel Universe Ultimate Spider-Man Vs. the Sinister 6: Adaptation of 4th season.
Marvel Universe Ultimate Spider-Man: Web-Warriors: Spider-Verse: Adaptation of 3rd season (Infinite Comics version of Ultimate Spider-Man: Web-Warriors: Spider-Verse?).
Ultimate Spider-Man Infinite Comic: Adaptation of first 2 seasons.
Ultimate Spider-Man Magazine: It is a series of magazines with reprinted stories from Marvel Universe Ultimate Spider-Man, puzzles, games, and a pull-out poster. 6 numbered issues were published by Redan Publishing, Inc. in 2015.

English version by Marvel
Marvel Universe Ultimate Spider-Man: Web-Warriors: Spider-Verse (ISBN 978-0-7851-9442-2, 2016-03-29/2016-04-13): Includes Marvel Universe Ultimate Spider-Man: Spider-Verse #13-16.

References

External links

Marvel pages: TV series, MUUS-M2012, US-MW-W2014, US-MW-WS-V2015, US-MIC2016, MUUS-MVTS62016, MUUS-MWWS-V2018
Redan Publishing, Inc. page

2012 American television series debuts
2017 American television series endings
2010s American animated television series
2010s American comic science fiction television series
2010s American superhero comedy television series
American children's animated action television series
American children's animated adventure television series
American children's animated comic science fiction television series
American children's animated drama television series
American children's animated science fantasy television series
American children's animated superhero television series
Animated Spider-Man television series
Animated television series based on Marvel Comics
Anime-influenced Western animated television series
Disney XD original programming
English-language television shows
Television series by Film Roman
Man of Action Studios
Marvel Animation
Teen animated television series
Teen superhero television series
Television shows based on Marvel Comics
Television series based on works by Brian Michael Bendis
Television series by Disney–ABC Domestic Television
Television shows set in New York City